Zhou Yuye (born 12 December 2000) is a Chinese footballer currently playing as a defender for Wuxi Wugou.

Career statistics

Club
.

Notes

References

2000 births
Living people
Chinese footballers
Association football defenders
China League One players
Mito HollyHock players
Jiangxi Beidamen F.C. players
Chinese expatriate sportspeople in Japan
Expatriate footballers in Japan